HMS Severn was a 50-gun fourth rate ship of the line of the Royal Navy, built at King's Yard in Harwich by John Barnard as a sister ship to HMS Lichfield (1746) to the draught specified by the 1745 Establishment, and launched on 10 July 1747.

Severn served until 1759, when she was sold out of the navy for only £74.

Notes

References

Lavery, Brian (2003) The Ship of the Line - Volume 1: The development of the battlefleet 1650-1850. Conway Maritime Press. .

Ships of the line of the Royal Navy
1747 ships